Ceriano Laghetto-Solaro railway station is a railway station in Italy. Located on the Saronno–Seregno railway, it serves the municipalities of Ceriano Laghetto and Solaro.

Services 
Ceriano Laghetto-Solaro is served by line S9 of the Milan suburban railway service, operated by the Lombard railway company Trenord.

See also 
Milan suburban railway service

References

External links 

Railway stations in Lombardy
Milan S Lines stations
Railway stations opened in 2012